The second elections to Lanarkshire County Council were held on 6 December 1892 as part of the wider 1892 local elections.

There were only contests in 19 of the councils 66 divisions, with 47 members being returned unopposed. In two of the 19 divisions (Bishopbriggs and Overton) candidates (Sir William Hozier and David McLardy respectively) had been nominated without their consent, and withdrew their names. Hozier had prior to the election served as the councils Chairman.

Council results

Electoral division results

Abington

Avondale

Baillieston North

Baillieston South

Bellshill

Biggar

Biggar (Burgh)

Bishopbriggs

Blackwood

High Blantyre

Bothwell

Cambuslang North

Cambuslang South

Carluke East

Carluke West

Carnwath

Curyston

Dalserf

Dalzell

Douglas

Dykehead & Cleland

East Kilbride

Forth

Govan Bellahouston

Govan Cessnock

Govan Craigton

Govan Cross

Govan Fairfield

Govan Plantation North

Govan Broomloan

Govan South

Govan Whitefield

Hamilton

Harthill & Shotts Kirk

Holytown

Kinning Park First

Kinning Park Second

Kinning Park Third

Kinning Park Fourth

Kirkfieldbank

Lesmahagow

Lanark

Larkhall

Monkland New North

Monkland New South

Monkland Old

Motherwell Central

Motherwell North

Motherwell South

Newmains

Partick North

Partick North-East

Partick South

Partick West

Possil

Rutherglen

Shettleston North

Shettleston South

Stonefield

Overton

Stonehouse & Glassford

Uddingston

Wishaw East

Wishaw West

References

December 1892 events
1892 Scottish local elections
Lanarkshire Council elections
Council elections in Scotland